Mary Brush (fl. 1815) of Davenport, Iowa, was an American inventor and one of the first American women to be granted a patent by the U.S. patent office. Her patent, granted on 21 July 1815, was for a corset. It improved on the design and was meant to "preserve the shape of the womanly figure."  The Cincinnati Enquirer, in 1908, identified her as the second American woman to be granted a patent.

References

 Serial Set Vol. No. 207, Report H. Doc. 50 of 13 January 1831 at GenealogyBank.

19th-century American inventors
Year of death missing
Women inventors
American women engineers
Year of birth missing
19th-century American businesspeople
19th-century American businesswomen